William Sherwin (1607–c.1687) was an English minister. He acted as lecturer or assistant to the Rev Josias Byrd, the Rector at the church of St Mary the Virgin at Baldock.

Life
The Dictionary of National Biography suggests that he was either silenced in 1660 or ejected in 1662. He wrote a number of works on biblical and theological themes.

He died at Fowlmere, Cambridge, in the house of his son-in-law, aged about 80. Sherwin married, on 11 September 1637, Dorothea Swan, described as ‘generosa.’ His son (also called William Sherwin) became a notable engraver.

References

1607 births
1687 deaths
People from Baldock
Ejected English ministers of 1662